Tibor Házi born Tibor Hoffmann,  (February 9, 1912 – February 18, 1999), was a male international table tennis player from Hungary.

Sports career
He won nine medals in singles, doubles, and team events in the World Table Tennis Championships from the 1932 World Table Tennis Championships to 1938 World Table Tennis Championships.

The nine medals included three team gold medals. After settling in the United States he continued to play for thirty years.

Personal life
He was born as Tibor Hoffmann in 1912 but as Hungarian society became anti-Semitic he changed his name to Házi.

He married her fellow international player Magda Gál in 1937 and in 1939 they fled to the United States because of their Jewish origins and they settled in Bethesda, Maryland. Gál died in 1990 aged 83 and Házi died in 1999.

See also
 List of table tennis players
 List of World Table Tennis Championships medalists

References

Hungarian male table tennis players
American male table tennis players
Jewish table tennis players
1912 births
1999 deaths
Hungarian emigrants to the United States